Macdonald Ngwa Niba (born 8 August 1994) is a Cameroonian professional footballer who plays as a centre-back for Canadian club Atlético Ottawa.

Early life
In his native Cameroon, Niba attended the University of Buea, where he played for the school's football team, being named the team's best player in the 2013-14 season, and also played for Cinyodev FC.

Club career

North Toronto Nitros
In 2016 season, he played for the North Toronto Nitros in the Canadian third tier League1 Ontario, making his debut on 30 April against Vaughan Azzurri. He scored his first goal on May 8, against Toronto Skillz FC. Over the course of the season, he played 18 league matches, scoring seven goals. That season, he was named a Mid-Season All-Star, was named to the year-end League1 Ontario All-Star Team and was also named Defender of the Year.

Nitra
On 27 February 2017, Niba signed with Slovakian 2. Liga club FC Nitra. On 22 July 2017 Niba made his Fortuna Liga debut against Žilina. In his first four matches, he was named man of the match three times, also earning Player Of The Week honours once and being named to the Team of the Week each time. That season he made eight appearances for Nitra, scoring two goals and helping the club earn promotion to the Fortuna Liga.

Budapest Honvéd
In 2019, he joined Hungarian club Budapest Honvéd FC. In 2020, he won the Hungarian Cup with Honved, entering the finals as a 95th minute substitute. During his season with Honvéd, he dealt with some injuries, as well as the interruption of the season due to the COVID-19 pandemic.

Doxa Drama
In October 2020, he joined Doxa Drama F.C. in the Greek second tier.

KuPS
In April 2021, he joined Finnish first tier side KuPS on a one-year contract until December 2021. In May, they won the 2021 Finnish Cup.

Atlético Ottawa
On 26 January 2022, Niba returned to Canada, signing a two-year contract with Canadian Premier League side Atlético Ottawa.

International career
In 2017, he was named to the Cameroon U23 preliminary squad for the 2017 Islamic Solidarity Games, although he did not make the final roster.

Honours

Atlético Ottawa 
 Canadian Premier League
Regular Season: 2022

Career statistics

Honours
Individual
League1 Ontario Defender of the Year: 2016
League1 Ontario All-Star: 2016

Club
Hungarian Cup: 2019–20
Finnish Cup: 2021

References

External links
 FC Nitra official club profile
 
 Futbalnet profile

1994 births
Living people
Association football defenders
Cameroonian footballers
People from Buea
Cameroonian expatriate footballers
Expatriate soccer players in Canada
Cameroonian expatriate sportspeople in Canada
Expatriate footballers in Slovakia
Cameroonian expatriate sportspeople in Slovakia
Expatriate footballers in Hungary
Cameroonian expatriate sportspeople in Hungary
Expatriate footballers in Greece
Cameroonian expatriate sportspeople in Greece
Expatriate footballers in Finland
Cameroonian expatriate sportspeople in Finland
University of Buea alumni
North Toronto Nitros players
FC Nitra players
Budapest Honvéd FC players
Kuopion Palloseura players
SC Kuopio Futis-98 players
Atlético Ottawa players
League1 Ontario players
Slovak Super Liga players
Nemzeti Bajnokság I players
Veikkausliiga players
Kakkonen players